Jorge Gutiérrez Espinosa (born 18 September 1975, in Camagüey) is a former boxer from Cuba. He won the Middleweight Gold medal at the 2000 Summer Olympics.

Gutiérrez's Olympic results were:
Defeated Somchai Chimlum (Thailand) 20–11
Defeated Antonios Giannoulas (Greece) 20–7
Defeated Adrian Diaconu (Romania) KO 1
Defeated Vugar Alekperov (Azerbaijan) 19–9
Defeated Gaydarbek Gaydarbekov (Russia) 17–15
He was technically too old to compete in the 1994 World Junior Championship. He was 19 years old, born in 1975 (the limit was 1976).

Amateur highlights
 1994 World Junior champion at 71 kg
 1998 World cup champion at 75 kg
 1999 Pan American Games champion at 71 kg
 1999 World Championship Silver medalist, losing by WO to Marian Simion (ROM)

References

1975 births
Boxers at the 1999 Pan American Games
Boxers at the 2000 Summer Olympics
Olympic boxers of Cuba
Olympic gold medalists for Cuba
Living people
Sportspeople from Camagüey
Olympic medalists in boxing
Cuban male boxers
AIBA World Boxing Championships medalists
Medalists at the 2000 Summer Olympics
Pan American Games gold medalists for Cuba
Pan American Games medalists in boxing
Middleweight boxers
Medalists at the 1999 Pan American Games
20th-century Cuban people